Victor Mihalachi (born 24 February 1989) is a Romanian sprint canoeist who has competed since the late 2000s.

He won 4 gold medals at the ICF Canoe Sprint World Championships, two at the 2010 ICF Canoe Sprint World Championships in Poznań, earning them in the C-2 500 m and C-2 1000 m events, one at the 2011 ICF Canoe Sprint World Championships in Szeged (in the C-2 500 m) and one at the 2014 ICF Canoe Sprint World Championships in Moscow (in the C-2 1000 m).  He has also won two silvers, in the C-2 500 m (2014, 2017) and a bronze in the C-2 1000 m (2011).

He has also won three European gold medals (C-2 500 m 2010, 2011; C-2 1000 m 2012), 5 silvers (C-2 500 m 2012, 2013, 2014, 2016, 2017) and 4 bronze (C-2 1000 m 2010, 2011, 2013, C-2 200 m 2014).

He and his teammate Liviu Dumitrescu have worn lucky caps with marijuana leaves on to race in.  They competed at the 2012 Summer Olympics.

Mihalachi took up the sport at the age of 9.  He competed for Moldova as a junior but switched to competing for Romania as he felt he was not receiving enough support from the Moldovan Canoeing Federation.

References

External links
Romanialiberia.ro article on the 2010 ICF Canoe Sprint World Championships. – accessed 22 August 2010. 

Living people
Romanian male canoeists
1989 births
Canoeists at the 2012 Summer Olympics
Canoeists at the 2020 Summer Olympics
Olympic canoeists of Romania
ICF Canoe Sprint World Championships medalists in Canadian
Canoeists at the 2019 European Games
European Games medalists in canoeing
European Games gold medalists for Romania
People from Anenii Noi District